Kulwant Singh may refer to :
 Kulwant Singh (hockey player), an Indian field hockey player.
 Kulwant Singh (politician), an Indian politician
 Major General Kulwant Singh, UYSM, retired Indian Army general and Uttar Yudh Seva Medal (distinguished service award) winner.
 Kulwant Singh Bazigar
 Kulwant Singh Gill, retired Indian Air Force air marshal.
 Kulwant Singh Pandori
 Major General Kulwant Singh Pannu, MVC, retired Indian Army general and Maha Vir Chakra (gallantry award) winner.
 Kulwant Singh Virk, an Indian author who wrote in Punjabi.